Stephen Wilkes (born October 28, 1957) is an American photographer, photojournalist, director and fine artist. In 2009 he began work on the project, Day to Night. Featuring epic cityscapes and landscapes portrayed from a fixed camera angle for up to 30 hours, the work was designed to capture fleeting moments of humanity over the course of a full day. Day to Night was featured on CBS Sunday Morning as well as several other prominent media outlets and earned Wilkes a grant from the National Geographic Society, to extend the project to include America’s National Parks in celebration of their centennial anniversary and Bird Migration for the 2018 Year of the Bird. This was followed by an additional grant from the National Geographic Society allowing Wilkes to extend the series yet again with Day to Night of Canadian Iconic Species and Habitats at Risk in collaboration with The Royal Canadian Geographic Society. Day to Night: In the Field with Stephen Wilkes, a solo exhibition was exhibited at The National Geographic Museum in 2018. Day to Night was published by TASCHEN as a monograph in 2019.

Life and work 
Wilkes was born in 1957 in New York. He received his BS in photography from Syracuse University’s S.I. Newhouse School of Public Communications with a minor in business management from the Whitman School of Management in 1980. Since opening his New York studio in 1983, Stephen Wilkes has built a sizable body of work, gaining him notoriety as a photographer and wide recognition for his fine art, editorial and commercial work.

Wilkes’ early career interpretations of Mainland China, California’s Highway One, and impressionistic Burned Objects set the tone for a series of career-defining projects.

In 1998, a one-day assignment to the south side of Ellis Island led to a 5-year photographic study of the island’s long abandoned medical wards where immigrants were detained before they could enter America. His photographs and video helped secure donations upwards of $6 million for the restoration of the south side of Ellis Island. A monograph based on the work, Ellis Island: Ghosts of Freedom, was published in 2006 and was named one of TIME magazine’s 5 Best Photography Books of the Year. The work was also featured on NPR and CBS Sunday Morning.

In 2000, Epson America commissioned Wilkes to create a millennial portrait of the United States. America In Detail— a 52-day odyssey was exhibited in New York, Chicago, Los Angeles, and San Francisco.

Wilkes’ work documenting the ravages of Hurricanes Katrina and Sandy were intended to heighten awareness and draw attention to the realities of global climate change. He was commissioned by the Annenberg Space for Photography to revisit New Orleans in 2013 after documenting Hurricane Katrina for the World Monuments Fund. His photographs on Hurricane Sandy were exhibited in 2014 at the Annenberg Center for Photography.

Wilkes' directorial debut, the documentary film, Jay Myself, world premiered at DOCNYC in November 2018. The film is an in-depth look into the world of photographer Jay Maisel and his move out of his 35,000 sq. foot building at 190 Bowery. Oscilloscope Laboratories acquired the North American rights and the film opened at Film Forum in NYC in July 2019. Wilkes was a speaker at the TED2016: Dream Conference on his Day to Night series and he participated in the TED Countdown Summit in October 2020.

In 2017 Wilkes was commissioned by the US Embassy, Ottawa to create a Day to Night photograph of Canada’s 150th anniversary of Confederation. In 2021 Wilkes, now a National Geographic Explorer, was once again commissioned by the National Geographic Society to create a Day to Night of the Biden/Harris Presidential Inauguration. The photograph was featured in National Geographic and exhibited at Bryce Wolkowitz Gallery in NYC.

In addition to his work in the worlds of fine art and photography, Wilkes has also shot numerous advertising campaigns for companies such as: Netflix, Zillow, OppenheimerFunds, Gallup, SAP, IBM, Capital One, The New Yorker, Johnson & Johnson, DHL, American Express, Nike, Sony, Verizon, IBM, AT&T, Rolex and Honda.

Awards 

 American Photography, Selected Winner, 2014, 2015, 2017, 2018
 PDN Award of Excellence, Advertising, 2018
 Prix Pictet, Consumption, Honorable Mention, 2015
 PDN Award of Excellence, Photojournalism, Vanity Fair 2014
 PDN Award of Excellence, Photojournalism, Sandy 2013
 PDN Award of Excellence, Fine Art, Day to Night Shanghai 2013
 Time Magazine Top 10 Photographers of 2012
 Communication Arts Photography Award of Excellence 2012, 2013
 Sony World Photography Professional Award, 2012
 Adobe Breakthrough Photography Award, 2012
 Photo District News Award of Excellence, 2011
 PX3 Prix de la Photographie Paris Fine Art Series 2nd Place & 3rd Place, Photojournalism 2010 World in Focus PDN, Portraits/Sense of Place 1st, Place, 2008
 Prix De La Photographie Paris, Honorable Mention; Human Condition, 2007
 Lucie Awards 1st. Place, Professional Photographer, Editorial, The Rise of Big Water, 2007
 Lucie Awards 1st. Place, Fine Art, Ellis Island: Ghost of Freedom Lucie Awards, 2007 American Photography, Award of Excellence, 2005, 2007, 2009, 2010, 2011, 2013, 2014
 Photo District News Award of Excellence: 2002, 2005, 2006, 2008, 2009, 2010
 Graphis, 1992
 The Art Directors Club Distinctive Merit, 1992
 Communication Arts Award of Excellence 2000, 2001, 2002, 2004, 2006, 2007, 2008, 2010
 Epson Creativity Award, 2004
 Lucie Award Fine Art Photographer of the Year, 2004
 Adweek Magazine Photographer of the Year, 1992
 Alfred Eisenstaedt Award for Magazine Photography, 2000

Solo exhibitions museums 

 Day to Night, The Erarta Museum of Contemporary Art, St. Petersburg, Russia, January 2023
 Day to Night, Florida Museum of Photographic Arts, September, 2019
 Bird Migration, National Museum of Wildlife Art of The United States, May, 2019
 Day to Night: In the Field with Stephen Wilkes, National Geographic Museum, Washington, DC 2018
 Connecticut Responds & Reflects: 9/11, Fairfield Museum, Fairfield, CT, September 2011
 Ellis Island, Ghosts of Freedom, James A. Michener Art Museum, Doylestown, PA, June 2010
 Stephen Wilkes, Ellis Island, Griffin Museum of Photography, Winchester, MA, January 2008
 In Katrina’s Wake, World Monuments Fund Gallery, New York, NY, 2006

Solo Gallery Exhibitions 

 Stephen Wilkes, A Witness to Change, Jackson Fine Arts, Atlanta, May, 2020
 Stephen Wilkes: Day to Night, Monroe Gallery , Santa Fe, NM, October , 2019
 Stephen Wilkes: Day to Night, Fahey Klein Gallery, Los Angeles ,October 2019
 Stephen Wilkes: A Witness to Change, Bryce Wolkowitz, September, 2019
 Day to Night: Holden Luntz Gallery, Palm Beach, Florida, January, 2019
 Day to Night: ProjectB Gallery, Milan , Italy , November, 2018
 Day to Night, Galerie GADCOLLECTION, Paris, France, October 2017
 Day to Night, Bryce Wolkowitz Gallery, New York, NY, September 2017
 Ellis Island Ghosts of Freedom, Peter Fetterman Gallery, Santa Monica, Ca. March 2017
 Day to Night, Robert Klein Gallery, Boston, MA. August 2016
 Day to Night, Bryce Wolkowitz Gallery, New York, NY, November 2015
 Remnants, Monroe Gallery of Photography, Santa Fe, NM, 2015
 Day to Night, Peter Fetterman Gallery, Santa Monica, CA, September 2014
 Bethlehem Steel, ArtsQuest Center at SteelStacks, PA 2013
 Day to Night, Monroe Gallery of Photography, Santa Fe, NM, April 2012
 Connecticut Responds & Reflects: 9/11, Fairfield Museum, Fairfield, CT, September 2011
 Day to Night, Clampart Gallery, New York, NY, September 2011
 Steuben Glass Gallery, Ellis Island, New York, NY, November 2009
 Monroe Gallery of Photography, China, Santa Fe, NM, October 2008
 Fairfield Museum, Images, Fairfield, CT, April 2009
 The Construction of the Olympic Stadium and other Chinese Public Works, ClampArt, New York, NY, June 2008
 China, David Gallery, Los Angeles, CA, January 2008
 Stephen Wilkes, Ellis Island, Chicago Cultural Arts, Chicago, IL, July 2008
 Stephen Wilkes, Ellis Island, Griffin Museum of Photography, Winchester, MA, January 2008
 Stephen Wilkes, China, ClampArt, New York, NY, April 2007
 Stephen Wilkes, Ellis Island, ClampArt, New York, NY, April 2007
 Ellis Island Revisited, Monroe Gallery of Photography, Santa Fe, NM, 2006
 Ellis Island Revisited, David Gallery, Los Angeles, CA, 2006
 Bethlehem Steel, Monroe Gallery of Photography, Santa Fe, NM, 2005
 Bethlehem Steel, Apex Fine Art, Los Angeles, CA, 2004
 Ellis Island, Monroe Gallery of Photography, Santa Fe, NM, 2004
 Ellis Island, Apex Fine Art, Los Angeles, CA, 2003
 The Female Form on the Lava Beds of Hawaii, Soho Triad Fine Arts, New York, NY, 2002 Ellis Island, Soho Triad Fine Arts, New York, NY, 2001
 America in Detail, Chicago, New York, Los Angeles and San Francisco, 2000

Group Museum Exhibitions 

 Who Shot Sports: A photographic History, 1843–Present, Brooklyn Museum, NY, 2017
 Arts in Embassies: Ottawa, Canada, 2015
 Annenberg Space for Photography, Sink or Swim, Designing for a Sea of Change, December, 2014
 Museum of the City of New York, Rising Waters, Photographs of Hurricane Sandy, 2013–2014
 George Eastman House: The Art of Persuasion, Rochester, NY, 1992

Collections 

 The Erarta Museum of Contemporary Art, St. Petersburg, Russia George Eastman House International Museum of Film and Photography Dow Jones Collection
 The Museum of Fine Arts, Houston
 Library of Congress
 Carl and Marilynn Thoma Art Foundation
 Griffin Museum of Photography
 Jewish Museum New York
 Barclays Bank Corporate Collection
 James A. Michener Art Museum
 The Historic New Orleans Collection
 Museum of the City of New York
 Snite Museum of Art
 9/11 Memorial & Museum
 New Mexico Arts Division, Department of Cultural Affairs

References

External links
Stephen Wilkes Website
 Ellis Island Ghosts 
 Stephen Wilkes Photography 
 Article on an exhibition of Wilkes work at the Michener Art Museum 
 Article on Day to Night work on NY Daily News
GADCOLLECTION Gallery
Monroe Gallery
Bernstein & Andriulli
Jay Myself Film
TASCHEN Day to Night Monograph

American photographers
Living people
S.I. Newhouse School of Public Communications alumni
Fine art photographers
1957 births